The Tuapeka by-election was a by-election in the New Zealand electorate of Tuapeka, a rural seat at the bottom of the South Island.

The by-election was held on 5 June 1908, and was precipitated by the death of sitting Liberal member of parliament James Bennet. The election was won by William Chapple who stood as an independent Liberal.

Result
The following table gives the election results:

References

Tuapeka, 1908
1908 elections in New Zealand
Politics of Otago